beatmania IIDX 8th Style is a 2002 arcade game released by Konami. A PlayStation 2 version was released in 2004.

Gameplay
Beatmania IIDX tasks the player with performing songs through a controller consisting of seven key buttons and a scratchable turntable. Hitting the notes with strong timing increases the score and groove gauge bar, allowing the player to finish the stage. Failing to do so depletes the gauge until it is empty, abruptly ending the song.

Music
This is the complete list of new songs from the arcade version of Beatmania IIDX 8th Style. Songs highlighted in green need to be unlocked. The Extra Stage is "桜", while the One More Extra Stage is "xenon".

Home version
beatmania IIDX 8th Style: Direct port of the arcade version, with three preview songs from IIDX RED, as well as new songs, and some revivals.

References

2002 video games
2004 video games
Arcade video games
Beatmania games
PlayStation 2 games
Japan-exclusive video games
Multiplayer and single-player video games
Video games developed in Japan
Video games scored by Naoki Maeda